This is a list of warships which took part in the Normandy landings on June 6, 1944.

Battleships
Seven battleships took part: four British and three US:
 , eastern Omaha Beach (26,100 tons, main armament: twelve 12" guns) primarily in support of the US 29th Infantry Division.
 , Utah Beach (29,000 tons, main armament: ten 14" guns).
  (1915, 33,500 tons, main armament: eight 15-inch guns).
  (1925, Nelson-class, 38,000 tons, main armament: nine 16-inch guns).
 , western Omaha Beach (27,000 tons, main armament: ten 14-inch guns, Flagship of Rear Admiral Carleton F. Bryant) primarily in support of the US 1st Infantry Division.
  (1913, 35,000 tons, main armament eight 15-inch guns, only six operational).

In addition  ( main armament: nine 16-inch guns) was held in reserve until June 10.

Heavy cruisers
Five heavy cruisers (main guns of 8 inches) took part, three from the United States and two from Britain, HMS Hawkins had her original armament of seven 7.5-inch guns while HMS Frobishers main gun armament had been reduced from seven to five single-mounted 7.5-inch guns.
 USS Augusta (Flagship of Rear Admiral Alan Kirk – Lt. General Omar Bradley embarked)
 HMS Frobisher
 HMS Hawkins
 USS Quincy
 USS Tuscaloosa

Light cruisers
17 British light cruisers took part along with two of the Free French navy, and one of the Polish navy.  All carried either 6- or 5.25-inch guns of varying numbers.

 
 
 HMS Arethusa
  (Flagship of Rear Admiral Frederick Dalrymple-Hamilton)
 HMS Bellona - also carried jamming equipment against radio controlled bombs
 
 HMS Capetown
  (Flagship of U.S. Service Force)
 HMS Danae
 HMS Diadem
 ORP Dragon (Polish, damaged in July and then used as a blockship in "Gooseberry" breakwater)
 HMS Emerald
 HMS Enterprise
 Georges Leygues (Free French)
 HMS Glasgow
 HMS Mauritius (Flagship of Rear Admiral Patterson)
 Montcalm (Free French, Flagship of Rear Admiral Jaujard)
 HMS Orion (which fired the first shell of the coastal bombardment)
 HMS Scylla (Rear Admiral Philip Vian's flagship, mined and seriously damaged, out of action until after the war)
 HMS Sirius In reserve until June 10

Destroyers and escorts
139 ships (eighty-five British and Dominion, 40 US, 10 Free French and 7 other Allied):

 HMCS Alberni (Canadian)
 HMCS Algonquin (Canadian)
 USS Amesbury
 USS Baldwin
 USS Barton
 HMS Beagle
 HMS Bleasdale
 ORP Błyskawica
 HMS Boadicea (torpedoed and sunk 13 June)
 HMCS Cape Breton (Canadian)
 USS Carmick
 HMS Cattistock
 HMCS Chaudiere (Canadian)
 USS Corry (sunk during the invasion)
 HMS Cottesmore
 USS Doyle
 HMS Eglinton
 USS Emmons
 HMS Faulknor
 USS Fitch
 USS Frankford
 HMS Fury (mined 21 June and not repaired)
 USS Glennon (hit by mine 8 June, sunk by German artillery 10 June)
 
 HNoMS Glaisdale (Norwegian)
 HMS Grenville
 USS Harding
 USS Herndon
 USS Hobson
 
 HMS Jervis
 HMS Kelvin
 HMS Kempenfelt
 HMCS Kitchener (Canadian)
 ORP Krakowiak, (Polish, former HMS Silverton)
 La Combattante (Free French, former HMS Haldon)
 USS Laffey
 HMS Loyalty
 USS Maloy
 USS McCook
 HMS Melbreak
 HMS Middleton
 USS Murphy
 USS O'Brien
 HMS Pytchley
 
 HMCS Regina (Canadian)
 USS Rich (sunk by mines 10 June)
 USS Rodman
 USS Satterlee
 
 HMS Scorpion
 HMS Scourge
 HMS Serapis
 USS Shubrick
 HMCS Sioux (Canadian)
 ORP Ślązak (Polish)
 HMS Stevenstone
 HNoMS Stord (Norwegian)
 HNoMS Svenner (Norwegian, hit by German torpedo and sunk off Normandy at dawn, 6 June)
 HMS Swift (mined and sunk 24 June 1944 off Normandy)
 HMS Talybont
 HMS Tanatside
 USS Thompson
 HMS Ulster
 HMS Ulysses
 HMS Undaunted
 HMS Undine
 HMS Urania
 HMS Urchin
 HMS Ursa
 
 
 HMS Vigilant
 
 HMS Wanderer
 HMS Wallflower
 HMS Whimbrel
 HMS Wrestler (damaged by a mine and not repaired)
 RHN Kriezis Royal Hellenic Navy (Greece, Flower-class corvette ex HMS Coreopsis (K32))
 RHN Tombazis Royal Hellenic Navy (Greece, Flower-class corvette ex HMS Tamarisk (K216))

 Frigate La Surprise ( Free French )
 Frigate  ( Free French )
 Frigate La Découverte ( Free French )
 Frigate L'Aventure ( Free French )
 Corvette Aconit ( Free French )
 Corvette La Renoncule ( Free French )
 Corvette La Roselys ( Free French )
 Corvette d'Estienne d'Orves ( Free French )
 Submarine-hunter Benodet ( Free French )

Monitors
 HMS Erebus, monitor  with two 15-inch guns
 HMS Roberts, monitor with two 15-inch guns

Troop transports
 USS Joseph T. Dickman, attack transport
 USS Samuel Chase, attack transport operated by the US Coast Guard
 USS Charles Carroll, attack transport
 USS Bayfield, attack transport
 USS Henrico, attack transport

Other warships
508 ships (352 British, 154 US and 2 other Allied):
 HMS Bulolo, Landing Ship Headquarters (LSH) for Gold Beach carrying tri-service commanders and staff
 HMS Centurion, old battleship sunk as a blockship to form part of "Gooseberry" breakwater of the Mulberry harbour on Sword beach
 Courbet, Free Naval French Forces, former battleship, sunk as a blockship in "Gooseberry" breakwater on Sword beach
 Forbin, Free Naval French Forces, patrol boat, sunk as a artificial dike in "Arromanches"on Gold Beach
 HMCS Cowichan, Canadian minesweeper
 , Captain class frigate converted to act as a headquarters ship
 HMS Durban (light cruiser used as a blockship in "Gooseberry" breakwater)
 , Dutch gunboat
 HMS Hilary, H.Q. ship for Juno Beach carrying tri-service commanders and staff
 , Captain class frigate converted to act as a headquarters ship
 HMS Largs, H.Q. ship for Sword Beach carrying tri-service commanders and staff
 , Dutch gunboat
 , Captain class frigate converted to act as a headquarters ship (bombed and sunk)
 HNoMS Nordkapp, Norwegian patrol boat
 HNLMS Sumatra (Dutch, decommissioned due to crew shortages and losing her guns to HNLMS Flores and Soemba, used as blockship in "Gooseberry" breakwater)

The British 9th and 159th minesweeping flotillas and U.S. 7th Minesweeping Squadron provided minesweeping protection.

A distant anti-submarine screen to the operation was provided by HMS Onslow, Offa, Onslaught, Oribi, Melbreak and Brissenden. Additional protection from E-boats was provided by Motor Gun Boat flotillas.

Support
 HMS Boxer -  fighter direction ship
 HMS Bruiser - fighter direction ship

See also 
 List of Allied vessels involved in Operation Neptune
 List of ships of Force U Bombardment Group

Notes and references

World War II orders of battle